Sumu-la-El (also Sumulael or Sumu-la-ilu) was a King in the First Dynasty of Babylon. He reigned c. 1880-1845 BC . He subjugated and conquered nearby cities like Kish and built a string of fortresses around his territory.

See also

Babylonia

References

19th-century BC Babylonian kings
18th-century BC Babylonian kings
First dynasty of Babylon
19th-century BC births
18th-century BC deaths
Year of birth unknown